Bangladesh Public Service Commission is a quasi judicial constitutional body established in 1972. The commission is responsible for the recruitment of civil service servants in the Bangladesh government. It was formed by Section 137 of Part IX, Chapter II of the Constitution of Bangladesh.

History 
The commission started as a public service commission in 1926 during British India. It was later known as the East Pakistan Public service commission after the partition of India. After the Independence of Bangladesh it was established as the Bangladesh Public Service Commission in 1972. For a while it used the Chummery House as its headquarters. It is responsible for holding Bangladesh Civil Service (BCS) Examinations and publishing its results.

Chairmen
List of chairmen:
 A. Q. M. Bazlul Karim (December 1977 – May 1992)
 Mohiuddin Ahmed (December 1977 – May 1992)
 M. Moydul Islam (December 1977 – December 1982)
 Faiz Uddin Ahmed (December 1982 – May 1986)
 S. M. Al Hussaini (June 1986 – May 1991)
 Iajuddin Ahmed (September 1991 – February 1993)
 S. M. A. Foyaz (March 1993 – March 1998)
 Md. Mustafa Chowdhury (March 1998 - January 2002)
 Z. N. Tahomida Begum (May 2002 – May 2007)
 Saadat Husain (May 2007 – November 2011)
 A. T. Ahmedul Huq Chowdhury (November 2011 – December 2013)
 Ikram Ahmed (December 2013 – April 2016)
 Muhammed Sadique (May 2016 – September 2020)
 Mohammed Sohrab Hossain (September 2020 – present)

References

Government agencies of Bangladesh
1926 establishments in India
National civil service commissions
Quasi-judicial bodies